The 2012 Western Athletic Conference baseball tournament began on May 23 and ended on May 26 or 27.  The top six regular season finishers of the league's seven teams met in the double-elimination tournament held at HoHoKam Stadium in Mesa, AZ.  Fifth seeded  won their sixth and final tournament championship and claimed the Western Athletic Conference's automatic bid to the 2012 NCAA Division I baseball tournament.  The Bulldogs joined the Mountain West Conference after the 2012 season.

Seeding and format
The top six finishers from the regular season were seeded one through six.  The bottom four seeds played on the first day, with the losers of each game playing an elimination game in game 3.  On day 2, the winners of games 1 and 2 played the top two seeds.  Higher seeds were protected by playing lower seeds or playing later elimination games.

Results

* - Indicates game required 13 innings.

Conference championship

All-Tournament Team
The following players were named to the All-Tournament Team.

Most Valuable Player
Jordan Luplow was named Tournament Most Valuable Player.  Luplow was a right fielder for Fresno State.

References

Tournament
Western Athletic Conference Baseball Tournament